This is the discography of American pop/R&B group Klymaxx.

Studio albums

 Album was never released

Compilation albums
Greatest Hits (1996, MCA)
20th Century Masters - The Millennium Collection: The Best of Klymaxx (2003, MCA)

Singles

References

External links
 
 Official Website

Discographies of American artists
Pop music group discographies
Soul music discographies